Thomas Vogel (born 28 June 1965, in Weimar) is a German former professional footballer who played as a forward. He later worked as a  coach and as a presidential advisor at Carl Zeiss Jena.

External links 
 

1965 births
Living people
Sportspeople from Weimar
Footballers from Thuringia
German footballers
East German footballers
Association football forwards
Bundesliga players
2. Bundesliga players
FC Rot-Weiß Erfurt players
1. FC Kaiserslautern players
Tennis Borussia Berlin players
FC Carl Zeiss Jena players
German football managers
FC Carl Zeiss Jena managers